The Komitas Quartet is a string quartet musical ensemble founded in Moscow in November 1924, and is the oldest-established string quartet in the world still performing. It is now in the third and fourth generation of membership.

Original line-up 
The founding members were four talented Armenian students at the Moscow State Tchaikovsky Conservatory:
1st violin: Avet Gabrielyan
2nd violin: Levon Ogandjanyan
Viola: Mikael Terian (Микаэл Тэриан)
Cello: Sergey Aslamazian

This group gave its first public performance in February 1925.

Origins 

This group, the best-known Armenian music group, carries the name of Komitas (Soghomon Soghomonyan, 1869–1935). Komitas was a monk whose genius brought a renaissance to Armenian music at the turn of the 20th century. During its uninterrupted creative life, celebrating its 85th anniversary in 2009, the quartet has become well known throughout the world, taking part in numerous international festivals, giving concerts in more than 80 countries, and demonstrating the highest standards of performance.
 
The quartet has performed with Sviatoslav Richter, Nina Dorliak, Emil Gilels, Dmitri Shostakovich, Mstislav Rostropovich, Victor Merzhanov, Konstantin Igumnov, Walter Zeufert, Mario Brunello, Anahit Nersesyan and other prominent musicians. Aram Khachaturian described the quartet as the jewel of the musical culture of Armenia. Many Armenian and foreign composers have dedicated works to the quartet. The quartet was the USSR State Prize and Armenian SSR State Prize winner. The latest award is St. Mesrop Mashtots order given by Armenia President to Eduard Tadevosyan in 2010.
The current members of the quartet are the third and fourth generation of players.

Current line-up 
 1st violin: Eduard Tadevosyan
 2nd violin: Syuzi Yeritsyan
 Viola: Aleksandr Kosemyan
 Cello: Angela Sargsyan

Premieres

Recordings 
The quartet made a number of collection recordings in the USSR and released numerous albums in Russia, the United Kingdom, France and the United States. The latest CDs were released in recent three years. In 2007 "Armenian Contemporary Composers" studio album was released on the VEM label.
In 2002, the CD was released "On the Fortieth Day" on Traditional Crossroads label in New York, with "Two Devotions" by the composer Vache Sharafyan.
The next edition of the "Armenian Folk Miniatures" album was released in November 2010 by subvention of the Ministry of Culture of Armenia.

Management 
 Arman Padaryan 2002–2011
 Wise Business since 2011

References

Further reading
 The Montreal Gazette
 The Montreal Gazette II
 Eugene Register-Guard
 The Glasgow Herald

External links 
 Komitas Quartet - Armenian National Music
 Official site of the Komitas Quartet 
 Virtual Museum of Komitas Vardapet

Armenian musical groups
Soviet musical groups
Musical groups established in 1924
Russian string quartets